The Metropolitan Community Church of New York (MCCNY) is an LGBT (lesbian, gay, bisexual, and transgender) Christian church in New York City, located at 446 36th Street between Ninth and Tenth Avenue in the Hell's Kitchen neighborhood on the West Side of Midtown Manhattan.

Mission
While catering mainly to the LGBT population, the church is open to persons of all sexual orientations. MCCNY is affiliated with the Metropolitan Community Church (MCC), a worldwide fellowship of churches catering to LGBT persons and affirming LGBT-supportive theology.

The senior pastor is Pat Bumgardner, a minister and social justice activist. She lives in the West Village. Edgard Danielsen-Morales serves as the assistant pastor for congregational Life.

A newsletter titled The Query is published by the church.

History
The church itself was first established in Los Angeles in 1968 by Reverend Troy Perry. Its location changed four years later to New York, inside the Lesbian and Gay Services Center (now the Lesbian, Gay, Bisexual & Transgender Community Center), the address where it remained from 1983 to 1994. The church moved once again in 1994 to its current location at West 36th Street.

MCCNY charities

Sylvia Rivera Food Pantry: MCCNY Charities operates three weekly food pantry services. Tuesday to Friday hot meals/PWA food pantry and the Thursday morning client-choice groceries.

Sylvia's Place: MCCNY Homeless Youth Services is committed to turning the short time (up to 90 days) that youth spend as residents into a time of growth, safety and opportunity. MCCNY Homeless Youth Services provides:
 Drop in services provided 6 days a week 5-9 Mon-Sat
 Emergency overnight services
 Connections to long-term housing
 Case management
 Advocacy groups
 Showers
 Hot meals
Reverend Pat Finishing School.
Q Clinic: Columbia Medial for LGBTQI+ Youth.

Current and former funders of MCCNY Charities have included Ran Murphy Productions, Broadway Cares/Equity Fights AIDS, and The Citizens Committee for New York City.

Notable parishioners
 Sylvia Rivera

See also

LGBT culture in New York City
LGBT-affirming religious groups

References

Further reading
Patrick S. Cheng. 2011. Radical Love: An Introduction to Queer Theology. Church Publishing, Inc., March 1, 2011

Eric M. Rodriguez and Suzanne C. Ouellette, "The Metropolitan Community Church of New York: A Gay and Lesbian Community," The Community Psychologist 32, no. 3 (1999): 24–29
Rodriguez, E. M. and Ouellette, S. C. (2000), "Gay and Lesbian Christians: Homosexual and Religious Identity Integration in the Members and Participants of a Gay-Positive Church." Journal for the Scientific Study of Religion, 39: 333–347.

External links
 
 http://www.mccny.org/charities/

Churches in Manhattan
Metropolitan Community Churches
LGBT churches in the United States
LGBT organizations based in New York City
Hell's Kitchen, Manhattan
1972 in LGBT history
1972 establishments in New York City
Organizations established in 1972